The 2010–11 Puebla season was the 64th professional season of Mexico's top-flight football league. The season is split into two tournaments—the Torneo Apertura and the Torneo Clausura—each with identical formats and each contested by the same eighteen teams. Cruz Azul will begin their season on July 24, 2010 against Guadalajara

Torneo Apertura

Squad

On loan

Apertura 2010 results

Regular season

Goalscorers

Transfers

In

Out

Results

Results summary

Results by round

Torneo Clausura

Squad

Clausura 2011 results

Regular season

Goalscorers

Results

Results summary

Results by round

References 

2010–11 Primera División de México season
Mexican football clubs 2010–11 season
2010–11